Norman Whatley (8 September 1884 – 1 April 1965) was an English educationalist, headmaster of Clifton College from 1923-1939, and also a historian, Fellow of Hertford College, Oxford. He served during the First World War. He was Mayor of Oxford 1949-1950. He was editor of The Isis Magazine, 1904–1905.

References 

 Mr. Norman Whatley. Obituaries, The Times, Saturday, Apr 03, 1965; pg. 10; Issue 56287; col F
 ‘WHATLEY, Norman’, Who Was Who, A & C Black, an imprint of Bloomsbury Publishing plc, 1920–2008; online edn, Oxford University Press, Dec 2007 accessed 23 March 2013

1884 births
1965 deaths
Fellows of Hertford College, Oxford
Headmasters of Clifton College
Place of birth missing
Place of death missing
Mayors of Oxford
20th-century English educators